NBAS may refer to:

 New Balance Athletic Shoe footwear manufacturer
 Neonatal Behavioral Assessment Scale
 Nick Briggs Appreciation Society